The English women's cricket team toured New Zealand and Australia between November 1957 and March 1958. Against New Zealand they played two Test matches, which were both drawn. 

Against Australia, they contested The Women's Ashes for the fifth time. The four match Test series was drawn 0–0, which resulted in Australia retaining the Ashes.

Tour of New Zealand

Tour matches

2-day match: North Island vs England

2-day match: Canterbury vs England

2-day match: Otago vs England

1-day match: Southland vs England

2-day match: South Island vs England

1-day match: Nelson vs England

2-day match: Wellington vs England

1-day match: Wanganui and Wellington vs England

2-day match: Auckland vs England

1-day match: Matamata vs England

2-day match: New Zealand England Touring Team vs England

Test series

1st Test

2nd Test

Tour of Australia

Tour matches

1-day match: Bathurst vs England

2-day match: Queensland vs England

1-day match: Queensland vs England

1-day match: Brisbane vs England

2-day match: Australian XI vs England

1-day match: Metropolitan XI vs England

2-day match: New South Wales vs England

1-day match: New South Wales XI vs England

2-day match: Victoria vs England

2-day match: South Australia vs England

1-day match: South Australia vs England

1-day match: Western Australia vs England

Test series

1st Test

2nd Test

3rd Test

4th Test

References

External links
England Women tour of New Zealand 1957/58 from Cricinfo
England Women tour of Australia 1957/58 from Cricinfo

1958 in women's cricket
1958 in Australian cricket
1958 in English cricket
Australia/New Zealand 1958
International cricket competitions from 1945–46 to 1960
The Women's Ashes
England 1958
England 1957